In the Latter Day Saint movement, the second anointing, or second endowment, is the pinnacle ordinance of the temple and an extension of the endowment ceremony. Founder Joseph Smith taught that the function of the ordinance was to ensure salvation, guarantee exaltation, and confer godhood. In the ordinance, a participant is anointed as a "priest and king" or a "priestess and queen", and is sealed to the highest degree of salvation available in Mormon theology.

In the Church of Jesus Christ of Latter-day Saints (LDS Church), Mormonism's largest denomination, the ordinance is currently only given in secret to a few select couples chosen by top leaders. The LDS Church regularly performed the ceremony for nominated couples from the 1840s to the 1920s, and continued less regularly into the 1940s. By 1941, about 15,000 second anointings had been performed for the living, and over 6,000 for the dead. The practice became much less common thereafter, but continues to this day, though, presently most LDS adherents are unaware of the ritual’s existence. Instructors in the Church's Institute of Religion are told to "not attempt in any way to discuss or answer questions about the second anointing."  The ordinance is also performed by many Mormon fundamentalist groups. However, it is not performed by denominations such as the Community of Christ (formerly RLDS), who historically did not practice the Nauvoo endowment ceremony.

History
Although Joseph Smith introduced the Nauvoo endowment in 1842, he stated that his work in establishing the "fullness of the priesthood" was not yet complete. In August 1843, church apostle Brigham Young stated that "[i]f any in the Church had the fullness of the priesthood, he did not know it". Young understood that the "fullness of the priesthood" involved an anointing as "king and priest", with the actual kingdom to be given after resurrection.

The first time a second anointing was performed was on September 28, 1843, when Smith and his wife Emma received it. During Smith's lifetime, the second anointing was performed on at least 20 men and 17 women. After Smith's death, Young was selected by the majority of Latter Day Saints as the church's leader, and in January 1846, he began administering the second anointing in the nearly completed Nauvoo Temple. Young re-administered the ordinance to many of those who had received it under Smith, and he delegated his authority to others, who performed nearly 600 second anointings (some to polygamous unions) before the temple was closed on February 7, 1846.

After migration to the Salt Lake Valley, the LDS Church did not conduct further second anointings until late 1866. Beginning in the 1870s, second anointings began to be performed vicariously for dead members of the church. In the 1880s, church president John Taylor was concerned that too many second anointings were being performed, and he instituted a series of procedural safeguards, requiring recommendation by a stake president, and a guideline that the ordinance "belonged particularly to old men". In 1901, church president Lorenzo Snow further limited accessibility to the ordinance by outlining stringent criteria for worthiness.

By 1918, over 14,000 second anointings had been performed for the living and the dead. During the administration of church President Heber J. Grant in the 1920s, the frequency of second anointings was dramatically reduced. Stake presidents at the local congregation level were no longer permitted to recommend candidates for the ordinance; rather, recommendations could only be made by higher-ranking leaders in the Quorum of Twelve Apostles. By 1941, just under 15,000 second anointings had been performed for the living, and just over 6,000 for the dead. The church has not allowed historians to have access to second anointing records subsequent to 1941; therefore, the current frequency of second anointings is unknown. It is known that in 1942, 13 of the church's 32 general authorities had not received the second anointing. By 1949, the practice had been "practically discontinued" by the LDS Church, but continues to the present at least occasionally. For example, Russell M. Nelson, church president since 2018, mentioned in a 1979 autobiography that he and his wife attended "a special meeting [in the temple] at the invitation of President Spencer W. Kimball" in 1974 that could possibly have been for the Nelsons to receive the second anointing: "The sacred nature of this event precludes our mentioning more about it here other than to say that it did take place, but this experience is of the greatest importance to us and to our family."

The modern Latter-Day Saint practice is kept absolutely secret and is only given to a very small number of adherents, usually after a lifetime of loyal service to the church.

Ceremony

According to 19th-century journal entries and contemporary sources, the LDS second anointing ceremony consists of three parts:

 Prayer and Washing - First the couple and an officiator or two participate in a prayer circle (conducted by the husband) in a dedicated temple room, and then a male officiator washes only the husband's feet.
 Anointing - Next the officiator anoints the husband as a king and priest to God, and then anoints the wife as a queen and priestess to her husband. For example, the following words were used by Heber C. Kimball during the second anointing of Brigham Young in the Nauvoo temple in 1846: "Brother Brigham Young, I pour this holy consecrated oil upon your head and anoint thee a king and a priest of the most high God, over the Church of Jesus Christ of Latter-day Saints and unto all Israel. ... And I seal thee up unto eternal life, that thou shalt come forth in the morn of the first resurrection ... and thou shalt attain unto the eternal Godhead and receive a fulness of joy, and glory, and power; and that thou mayest do all things whatsoever is wisdom that thou shouldst do, even if it be to create worlds and redeem them."
 Washing of the Husband - Later, at home in private, the husband dedicates the house and room, then the wife symbolically prepares her husband for his death and resurrection as his priestess by washing and anointing the husband's feet and then laying her hands on his head to give a blessing.  This practice is linked to Mary anointing Christ prior to his death.

Before 1846 the woman was also anointed as a "priestess unto God," but Brigham Young changed the ceremony and readministered the rite such that the wife would now be a "queen and priestess unto thine husband." The woman would also be exalted through her husband instead of through God, but only if she "dost obey [her husband’s] counsel."

Meaning and symbolism
Those who participate in the second anointing ordinance are said to have received the "fullness of the priesthood" and have their "calling and election made sure", and their celestial marriage "sealed by the holy spirit of promise". They are said to have received the "more sure word of prophecy", "higher blessing," or their "second endowment."

The "first anointing" refers to the washing and anointing part of the endowment ceremony, in which a person is anointed to become a king and priest or a queen and priestess unto God. In the second anointing, on the other hand, participants are anointed as a king and priest, or queen and priestess. When the anointing is given, according to Brigham Young, the participant "will then have received the fulness of the Priesthood, all that can be given on earth."

The "first anointing" promises blessings in the afterlife contingent on the patron's faithfulness, while the second anointing actually bestows those blessings. According to prominent 20th-century LDS Church apostle Bruce R. McConkie, those who have their calling and election made sure "receive the more sure word of prophecy, which means that the Lord seals their exaltation upon them while they are yet in this life. ... [T]heir exaltation is assured."

The second anointing may have been intended to fulfill scriptural references to the "fulness of the priesthood", such as that in Doctrine and Covenants, a revelation by Joseph Smith commanding the building of a temple in Nauvoo, Illinois, in part, because "there is not a place found on earth that he may come to and restore again that which was lost unto you, or which he hath taken away, even the fulness of the priesthood" (emphasis added). LDS Church leaders have connected this ordinance with a statement by Peter in his second Epistle.  In , he talks about making one's "calling and election sure," and further remarks, "We have also a more sure word of prophecy". Smith referenced this process in saying, "When the Lord has thoroughly proved [a person], and finds that the [person] is determined to serve Him at all hazards, then the [person] will find his calling and election made sure".

The second anointing is performed only on married couples. A few writers have argued that because of this, women who receive the second anointing, in which they are anointed queens and priestesses, are ordained to the "fulness of the priesthood" in the same manner as their husbands. These scholars suggest that Smith may have considered these women to have, in fact, received the power of the priesthood, though not necessarily a specific priesthood office.

See also

 Anointed Quorum
 Sealing power

References

1843 establishments in Illinois
1843 in Christianity
Latter Day Saint ordinances, rituals, and symbolism
Latter Day Saint temple practices
Latter Day Saint terms